The 2017–18 Montreal Canadiens season was the 109th season for the franchise that was founded on December 4, 1909, and their 101st in the National Hockey League. For the second time in the past three seasons, the Canadiens failed to make the playoffs.

Standings

Schedule and results

Preseason
The preseason schedule was released on June 19, 2017.

Regular season
The regular season schedule was published on June 22, 2017.

Player statistics
Final

Skaters

Goaltenders

†Denotes player spent time with another team before joining Canadiens. Stats reflect time with Canadiens only.
‡Traded mid-season. Stats reflect time with Canadiens only.

Awards and honours

Awards

Milestones

Transactions
The Canadiens have been involved in the following transactions during the 2017–18 season.

Trades

Notes:
  Montreal to retain 50% of salary as part of trade.

Free agents acquired

Free agents lost

Claimed via waivers

Lost via waivers

Players released

Lost via Expansion Draft

Player signings

Draft picks

Below are the Montreal Canadiens' selections at the 2017 NHL Entry Draft, which was held on June 23 and 24, 2017 at the United Center in Chicago.

Draft notes:
 This was the Washington Capitals' original second-round pick, traded to the Canadiens on June 24, 2016 in exchange for Lars Eller and a second-round pick in 2018.
 The Canadiens acquired this pick from the Buffalo Sabres' as the result of a trade on June 17, 2017 that sent Nathan Beaulieu to Buffalo in exchange for it.
 The Canadiens original seventh-round pick was traded on June 25, 2016 to the Winnipeg Jets in exchange for a sixth-round pick in the 2016 draft. This pick was acquired from the Philadelphia Flyers' on June 24, 2017 in exchange for the Canadiens' seventh-round pick in 2018.

References

Montreal Canadiens seasons
Montreal Canadiens
Mont